Hank is a male given name. It may have been inspired by the Dutch name Henk, itself a short form of Hendrik and thus related to Henry & Harvey.

Given name or nickname
 Hank Aaron (1934-2021), Hall of Fame baseball player
 Hank Aguirre (1931–1994), Major League Baseball pitcher
 Hank Allen (born 1940), Major League Baseball outfielder
 Hank Anderson (1920–2005), American college basketball coach
 Hank Azaria (born 1964), American actor, director, voice actor and comedian best known for his voice work on The Simpsons
 Hank Ballard (1927–2003), American R&B singer and songwriter, born John Henry Kendricks
 Hank Bauer (1922–2007), American Major League Baseball right fielder and manager
 Hank Bauer (American football) (born 1954), National Football League running back and television and radio broadcaster
 Hank Biasatti (1922–1996), Italian-Canadian baseball and basketball player
 Hank Blalock (born 1980), Major League Baseball player
 Hank Borowy (1916–2004), Major League Baseball pitcher
 Hank Brown (born 1940), American retired politician and former senator from Colorado
 Hank Burnine (1932–2020), American National Football League player
 Hank Earl Carr (1968–1998), American convicted criminal who committed suicide
 Hank Cochran (1935–2010), American country music singer and songwriter
 Harry "Hank" Feldman (1919–1962), Major League Baseball pitcher
 Hank Garland (1930–2004), American studio musician
 Hank Gathers (1967–1990), basketball player
 Hank Green (born 1980), video blogger
 Hank Goldup (1918–2008), Canadian National Hockey League player 
 Hank Greenberg (1911–1986), Hall-of-Fame Major League Baseball player
 Hank Johnson (born 1954), U.S. Representative from Georgia
 Hank Johnson (baseball) (1906–1982), American Major League Baseball pitcher
 Hank Jones (1918–2010), American jazz pianist, bandleader, arranger, and composer
 Henry Iba (1904–1993), American Hall-of-Fame college basketball head coach
 Hank Ketcham (1920–2001), American cartoonist who created Dennis the Menace
 Hank Ketcham (American football) (1891–1986), American college football player
 Hank Kuehne (born 1975), American former professional golfer
 Hank Locklin (1918–2009), American country music singer and songwriter
 Hank Marvin, English musician, singer and songwriter born Brian Robson Rankin in 1941
 Hank Mobley (1930–1986), American hard bop and soul jazz saxophonist and composer
 Hank Norberg (1920–1974), American football player
 Hank Nowak (born 1950), Canadian National Hockey League player
 Henry Paulson (born 1946), former Secretary of the Treasury
 Hank Pfister (born 1953), American retired tennis player
 Hank Sauer (1917–2001), Major League Baseball player
 Henrik Sedin (born 1980), Swedish National Hockey League player
 Hank Snow (1914–1999), Canadian-American country music artist and songwriter
 Hank Stackpole (1935–2020), retired United States Marine Corps lieutenant general
 Hank Steinbrenner (1957–2020), part-owner of the New York Yankees
 Hank Stram (1923–2005), American National Football League head coach
 Hank Thompson (baseball) (1925–1969), baseball player in the Negro leagues and Major League Baseball
 Hank Thompson (musician) (1925–2007), American country music singer and songwriter
 Hank Wangford (born 1940), English country musician and psychiatrist
 Hank Williams (1923–1953), American country music singer, songwriter and musician
 Hank Williams Jr. (born 1949), American country music singer, songwriter and musician, son of Hank Williams
 Hank Williams III (born 1972), American musician and singer, son of Hank Williams Jr.
 Hank Worden (1901–1992), American actor born Norton Earl Worden
 Henrik Zetterberg (born 1980), National Hockey League player from Sweden
 Henrik Lundqvist (born 1982) National Hockey League player from Sweden
 Hank (dog), a dog rescued by the Milwaukee Brewers named after Hank Aaron
 Hank the Angry Drunken Dwarf, a nickname of entertainer Henry Joseph Nasiff Jr.

Surname
Carlos Hank González (1927–2001), Mexican politician and businessman
Carlos Hank González (businessman, born 1971) (born 1971), Mexican businessman
Carlos Hank Rhon, Mexican businessman
Jorge Hank Rhon (born 1956), Mexican businessman and former municipal president of Tijuana
William Hank (1902–1942), World War II US Navy officer

Fictional characters
Hank Anderson, a character in the game Detroit: Become Human.
Hank Dearborn, protagonist of the 1965 TV series Hank.
Hank Gannon, from the soap opera One Life to Live.
Hank Hall, a DC Comics character.
Hank Henshaw, DC Comics villain.
 Hank Thunderman, from the tv show, The Thundermans.
 Hank, from the 2003 film Cheaper by the Dozen.
Hank Hill, protagonist of the animated TV series King of the Hill.
Hank Jennings, from the TV show Twin Peaks.
Hank Lawson, protagonist of TV series Royal Pains.
Hank McCoy, a superhero, The Beast, from the Marvel comic series "X-Men".
Hank Moody, protagonist of the TV series Californication.
Hank Morgan, the Yankee in Mark Twain's A Connecticut Yankee in King Arthur's Court.
Hank Pym (aka Ant-Man, Giant-Man, Goliath, and Yellowjacket), fictional character in the Marvel Universe.
Hank Rearden, a central character in the novel Atlas Shrugged.
Hank Schrader, from the TV show Breaking Bad.
Hank Venture, fictional character in The Venture Bros..
Hank Voight, police sergeant in Chicago P.D..
Hank Zipzer, fictional character from the TV series Hank Zipzer.
Talking Hank, one of the main characters of Talking Tom and Friends.
Hank, main character in the Hank the Cowdog series of children's novels.
Hank, one of the two beavers in Pajanimals..
Hank, a giant Pacific octopus with a missing tentacle in the 2016 Disney/Pixar animated film Finding Dory.
Hank the American Engine, one of the characters in the twelfth series of Thomas and Friends.
Hank, the younger half brother of the titular character in The Bed and Breakfast Star by Jacqueline Wilson.

See also
Hanks, a surname

References

English masculine given names
Masculine given names
Hypocorisms
Surnames from given names